The 1910 Michigan gubernatorial election was held on November 1, 1910. Republican nominee Chase S. Osborn defeated Democratic candidate Lawton T. Hemans with 52.85% of the vote.

General election

Candidates
Major party candidates
Chase S. Osborn, Republican
Lawton T. Hemans, Democratic
Other candidates
Joseph Warnock, Socialist
Fred W. Corbett, Prohibition
Herman Richter, Socialist Labor

Results

References

1910
Michigan
Gubernatorial
November 1910 events